John A. Ricker nicknamed Jit is a former American baseball coach. He played college football at Bowdoin College before enrolling the Navy. He then served as the head baseball coach of the Tufts Jumbos from 1947 to 1955, leading the Jumbos to a fifth-place finish in the 1950 College World Series.

In 1929, Ricker was a back for the Bowdoin Polar Bears football team.

In 1947, Ricker, a former naval commander, was named the head baseball coach at Tufts University.

In addition to coaching baseball at Tufts, Ricker also was a football coach at Medford High School in Massachusetts.

Head coaching record

References

Bowdoin Polar Bears football players
Tufts Jumbos baseball coaches
High school football coaches in Massachusetts